Robin Irvine (21 December 1901, in Stoke Newington, London, England – 28 April 1933, in Bermuda) was a British film actor. He was married to actress Ursula Jeans from 1931 until his death from pleurisy aged 31.

Filmography
 The Secret Kingdom (1925)
 Downhill (1927)
 Land of Hope and Glory (1927)
 Confetti (1928)
 Easy Virtue (1928)
 Palais de danse (1928)
 The Rising Generation (1928)
 The Intruder (1928) – short
 Young Woodley (1928)
 A Knight in London (1929)
 Come Back, All Is Forgiven (1929)
 The Ship of Lost Souls (1929)
 Mischievous Miss (1930)
 Leave It to Me (1930)
 Keepers of Youth (1931)
 Above Rubies (1932)

References

External links
 
 Robin Irvine obituary in The Times
 Robin Irvine on Home Video at Brenton Film

1901 births
1933 deaths
English male film actors
English male silent film actors
20th-century English male actors
Male actors from London
People from Stoke Newington
20th-century British male actors